Haemanota sanguidorsia is a moth of the family Erebidae. It was described by William Schaus in 1905. It is found in French Guiana, Suriname, Guyana, Venezuela and on Cuba.

References

Haemanota
Moths described in 1905